Duke Hu may refer to:

Duke Hu of Chen ( 11th century BC)
Duke Hu of Qi ( 9th century BC)